Cheshire is an unincorporated community in Lane County, Oregon, United States. It is located near the Long Tom River and is southwest of Junction City on Oregon Route 36.

Demographics

History
Cheshire was a station on the Southern Pacific Railroad line platted in 1913 and originally named Hubert. This name caused confusion with another station on the line, Huber, however, so the railroad company changed the name to Cheshire in 1914. The Cheshire post office was established the same year. Both "Hubert" and "Cheshire" were names chosen to honor James Hubert Cheshire, a favorite child of the people in the area.

Business
Today, Cheshire's principal landmarks are a Dari Mart convenience store and a post office serving the 97419 zip code.

References

Unincorporated communities in Lane County, Oregon
1913 establishments in Oregon
Unincorporated communities in Oregon